Juan Carlos Robles Ania (born 29 December 1967 in Gijón, Asturias) is a Spanish volleyball player who represented his native country with the men's national team twice at the Summer Olympics: in 1992 and 2000.

Sporting achievements

National team
 1995  Universiade

References

  Spanish Olympic Committee

1967 births
Living people
Sportspeople from Gijón
Spanish men's volleyball players
Volleyball players at the 1992 Summer Olympics
Volleyball players at the 2000 Summer Olympics
Olympic volleyball players of Spain
Universiade medalists in volleyball
Universiade silver medalists for Spain
Medalists at the 1995 Summer Universiade